Sergey Kiselyov may refer to:

Sergey Kiselyov (footballer) (born 1976), Russian footballer
Sergei Kiselyov (swimmer) (born 1961), Russian swimmer